Kejdonia cachiai is a species of sea snail, a marine gastropod mollusk in the family Pyramidellidae, the pyrams and their allies.

Description
The length of the shell varies between .75 mm and 1.2 mm.

Distribution
This species occurs in the following locations:
 In the Mediterranean Sea off Malta.

References

External links
 To CLEMAM
 To Encyclopedia of Life
 To World Register of Marine Species

Pyramidellidae
Gastropods described in 1998
Molluscs of the Mediterranean Sea
Fauna of Malta